In mathematics, Ruffini's rule is a method for  computation of the Euclidean division of a polynomial by a binomial of the form x – r. It was described by Paolo Ruffini in 1804. The rule is a special case of synthetic division in which the divisor is a linear factor.

Algorithm
The rule establishes a method for dividing the polynomial:

by the binomial:

to obtain the quotient polynomial:

The algorithm is in fact the long division of P(x) by Q(x).

To divide P(x) by Q(x):

 Take the coefficients of P(x) and write them down in order. Then, write r at the bottom-left edge just over the line:

 Pass the leftmost coefficient (an) to the bottom just under the line.

 Multiply the rightmost number under the line by r, and write it over the line and one position to the right.

 Add the two values just placed in the same column.

 Repeat steps 3 and 4 until no numbers remain.

The b values are the coefficients of the result (R(x)) polynomial, the degree of which is one less than that of P(x). The final value obtained, s, is the remainder. The polynomial remainder theorem asserts that the remainder is equal to P(r), the value of the polynomial at r.

Example
Here is an example of polynomial division as described above.

Let:
 

P(x) will be divided by Q(x) using Ruffini's rule. The main problem is that Q(x) is not a binomial of the form x − r, but rather x + r. Q(x) must be rewritten as

Now the algorithm is applied:
Write down the coefficients and r. Note that, as P(x) didn't contain a coefficient for x, 0 is written:
     |     2     3     0  |  -4
     |                    |               
  -1 |                    |               
 ----|--------------------|-------
     |                    |               
     |                    |               
Pass the first coefficient down:
     |     2     3     0  |  -4
     |                    |               
  -1 |                    |               
 ----|--------------------|-------
     |     2              |               
     |                    |               
Multiply the last obtained value by r:
     |     2     3     0  |  -4
     |                    |               
  -1 |          -2        |                
 ----|--------------------|-------
     |     2              |               
     |                    |               
Add the values:
     |     2     3     0  |  -4
     |                    |
  -1 |          -2        |
 ----|--------------------|-------
     |     2     1        |
     |                    |               
Repeat steps 3 and 4 until it's finished:
     |     2     3     0   | -4
     |                     |
  -1 |          -2    -1   |  1
 ----|----------------------------
     |     2     1    -1   | -3
     |{result coefficients}|{remainder}

So, if original number = divisor × quotient + remainder, then
, where

 and

Application to polynomial factorization
Ruffini's rule can be used when one needs the quotient of a polynomial  by a binomial of the form  (When one needs only the remainder, the polynomial remainder theorem provides a simpler method.)

Then,  can be further factored by factoring 

The fundamental theorem of algebra states that every polynomial of positive degree has at least one complex root. The above process shows the fundamental theorem of algebra implies that every polynomial  can be factored as 

where  are complex numbers.

History
The method was invented by Paolo Ruffini, who took part in a competition organized by the Italian Scientific Society (of Forty). The challenge was to devise a method to find the roots of any polynomial. Five submissions were received. In 1804 Ruffini's was awarded first place and his method was published. He later published refinements of his work in 1807 and again in 1813.

See also
Lill's method, doing the division graphically
Horner's method

References

External links
 
 

Polynomials
Root-finding algorithms
Division (mathematics)